Von Graefe's sign is the lagging of the upper eyelid on downward rotation of the eye, indicating exophthalmic goiter (Graves' disease). It is a dynamic sign, whereas lid lag is a static sign which may also be present in cicatricial eyelid retraction or congenital ptosis.

A pseudo Graefe's sign (pseudo lid lag) shows a similar lag, but is due to aberrant regeneration of fibres of the oculomotor nerve (III) into the elevator of the upper lid. It occurs in paramyotonia congenita.
A pseudo Graefe's sign is most commonly manifested in just one eye but can occasionally be observed in both.  The reason only one eye is affected is not yet clear.

See also
Albrecht von Gräfe
Boston's sign
Griffith's sign
Graves orbitopathy
Hyperthyroidism, as lid lag may be in hyperthyroid patients lacking Graves' disease.

References

Ophthalmology
Symptoms and signs: Endocrinology, nutrition, and metabolism